Franzen (born Franzen Macaraig Fajardo on April 18, 1982 in Sampaloc, Manila) is a Filipino actor, TV host, and former reality show contestant.

Fajardo was forced evicted in the reality series Pinoy Big Brother on Day 91, November 19, 2005.

Early life
Franzen is married with one child.

Filipino audiences, specifically the lower-class population, supported Franzen because of his comedic and emotional nature.  He was considered the underdog housemate, especially during his first month inside the house.  He is also known for habitually picking his nose at all times and playing strip games with Jason inside the House.

Franzen had violated numerous house rules, but despite automatic nominations, popular vote had kept him in the House.  His mouthing of words (lip-synching) became the last straw. After much deliberation, Endemol decided on Day 86 (November 15, 2005) that Franzen should be evicted. However, in lieu of this, Cass (who somehow understood Franzen's "words") made up her mind to voluntarily exit from the house in exchange of his retention.  Big Brother valued this and decided to let the public choose whether Franzen should stay or leave.  The next day, however, voting was stopped and Franzen's automatic eviction was finalized after Franzen violated the rules again by telling Jason what happened in the confession room.

Filmography

Movies
White Lady (2006)
D'Lucky Ones! (2006)

TV shows
Maalaala Mo Kaya: Kurtina (2012)
Precious Hearts Romances Presents: Ang Lalaking Nagmahal Sa Akin (2009)
May Bukas Pa (2009)
Only You (2009)
Maria Flordeluna (2007)
Love Spell Presents: Wanted: Mr. Perfect (2006)
Komiks: Inday bote (2006)
Trip na Trip (2006)
Magandang Umaga, Pilipinas (2005–06)
Pinoy Big Brother (2005)

References

1982 births
Pinoy Big Brother contestants
Star Magic
Filipino male television actors
Filipino male comedians
Male actors from Metro Manila
People from Sampaloc, Manila
People from Valenzuela, Metro Manila
Living people